The 2011 CME Group Titleholders was the first CME Group Titleholders, a women's professional golf tournament and the season-ending event on the U.S.-based LPGA Tour. It was played November 17–20, 2011 at the Grand Cypress Golf Club in Orlando, Florida.

The top three finishers who were LPGA members from each official LPGA tournament, not otherwise qualified, earned a spot in the Titleholders. If tied, the player with the lower final round score qualified. 

South Korean Hee Young Park won by two strokes over Sandra Gal of Germany and Paula Creamer of the United States.

Qualifiers
The following table shows the three qualifiers for the Titleholders from each tournament.

Note: The following qualifiers did not play in the event: Shanshan Feng, Juli Inkster, Grace Park, Inbee Park, So Yeon Ryu, Jiyai Shin, Momoko Ueda.

Final leaderboard

References

CME Group Tour Championship
Golf in Florida
CME Group Titleholders
CME Group Titleholders
CME Group Titleholders
CME Group Titleholders